Devonshire Dock is the oldest of the four docks which make up the Port of Barrow in Barrow-in-Furness, England. Although the dock falls under the control of Associated British Ports it is currently solely utilised by BAE Systems. Upon completion of the dock, Prime Minister William Ewart Gladstone stated 'Barrow would one day become another Liverpool'. Although its shipbuilding capabilities have exceeded those on Merseyside, the port and dock system itself never fully met James Ramsden's grand vision for the town.

Construction of Devonshire Dock commenced in 1863 and was funded by the Furness Railway, which at the time controlled the new town's economy (iron ore extraction and transportation).

A large portion of Devonshire Dock was filled in during the 1980s to create more land for Barrow's growing shipyard. The majority of the land is now occupied by Devonshire Dock Hall a large indoor submarine building complex that has enabled the construction of all Royal Navy Vanguard-class and ''Astute-class submarines.

References

Devonshire